Hypostomus meleagris is a species of catfish in the family Loricariidae. It is native to South America, where it occurs in the upper and middle Paraná River basin. The species reaches 30 cm (11.8 inches) SL and is believed to be a facultative air-breather.

References 

Fish described in 1933
Hypostominae